Todd Barranger (born October 19, 1968) is an American professional golfer who played on the PGA Tour, Asian Tour and the Nationwide Tour.

Barranger joined the PGA Tour in 1994, earning his Tour card through qualifying school but he wasn't able to retain his card. He played in a limited amount of Nationwide Tour events in 1995 and 1996 due to being diagnosed with testicular cancer. After beating the disease, he joined the Nationwide Tour in 1997 but had to take a break from golf in 1998 and 1999 after it reemerged. He returned to golf in 2000, splitting time between the PGA and Nationwide Tour. He played on the Nationwide Tour full-time in 2001 and picked up his first victory at the Buy.com Dayton Open. The following year he recorded seven top-10 finishes including a runner-up and a third-place finish en route to a 15th-place finish on the money list, earning him his PGA Tour card for 2003. He was diagnosed with cancer for the second time midway through the PGA Tour season and it took a toll on his performance. He returned to the Nationwide Tour in 2004 where he would play until the following year. He played on the Asian Tour for three years and won the Thailand Open in 1996.

Professional wins (2)

Buy.com Tour wins (1)

Asia Golf Circuit wins (1)
1996 Thailand Open

Results in major championships

CUT = missed the half-way cut
Note: Barranger only played in the U.S. Open.

See also
1993 PGA Tour Qualifying School graduates
2002 Buy.com Tour graduates

References

External links

American male golfers
Asian Tour golfers
PGA Tour golfers
Korn Ferry Tour graduates
Golfers from New Jersey
People from Elmer, New Jersey
People from Hilton Head, South Carolina
Sportspeople from Salem County, New Jersey
1968 births
Living people